Whippany may refer to the following in the U.S. state of New Jersey:

Whippany, New Jersey, a town in Morris County
Whippany Railway Museum, a railway museum and excursion train ride in the above town
Whippany River, a tributary of the Rockaway River in Morris County